The Siege of Daman of 1639, also called the Great Siege of Daman was a military engagement between Portuguese forces and those of the Mughal Empire in the city of Daman, in India. A Mughal army commanded by the Mughal prince-heir Aurangzeb attempted to assault Daman, but was repulsed in the face of stubborn Portuguese resistance.

The siege
After invading the territory of Daman, the Mughals set up their camp in Magravará, and from there dug trenches and siege works to approach Daman. All male Portuguese residents able to bear arms were called up for service, and engaged with the Mughals outside the walls in an attempt to keep them at bay.

As reports reached Goa and neighbouring Portuguese garrisons of the siege, reinforcements were dispatched to Daman. The viceroy sent a detachment of troops under the command of the captain-major of the north Dom Braz de Castro, who upon arriving at Daman conducted a number of limited sallies against the Mughals outside the walls several times, though he was strictly forbidden on the viceroys orders.

The defenders of Daman were later joined by reinforcements under the command of general Luiz de Mello e Sampayo, who ordered a general sally with all of his troops. The Portuguese managed to surprise the Mughals and capture the siege-works closest to the city, but were afterwards forced to withdraw back behind the city walls by the numerical superiority of the Mughals. General Sampayo and his son Diogo were both wounded in the action while covering the retreat of their men, and general Luiz de Mello Sampayo died two days later at Daman. He was replaced by captain-major António Telles de Menezes.

On the evening of January 5th 1639, an English ship transporting William Methwold, who had recently resigned the position of president of the English commerce in India called at Daman, and despite the siege, the Portuguese captain of the city offered Methwold a barrel of wine and other refreshments. Because the Mughals were unable to cut the naval supply lines to Daman, the Portuguese were able to continuously reinforce the city from the sea.

Unable to break through Portuguese defenses despite mounting casualties, the Mughals requested peace through the governor of Surat Mir Musa, with the help of the president of the English East India Company factory at Surat, and later lifted the siege, having lost 700 to 7000 men in the action.

See also
Portuguese India
Siege of Daman (1581)

References

Battles involving Portuguese India
Battles involving the Mughal Empire
Sieges involving Portugal
17th century in Portuguese India